Jalia may refer to:

Places in Gujarat, India

 Jalia Devani, a former Hindu Rajput non-salute princely state 
 Jalia (Amreli), a village
 Jalia Amaraji, a village and former Rajput petty princely state 
 Jalia Manaji, a village and former Rajput petty princely state

Other uses
 JALIA, the Journal of the Australian Library and Information Association